Burland is a civil parish in Cheshire East, England.  It contains 20 buildings that are recorded in the National Heritage List for England as designated listed buildings, all of which are at Grade II.  This grade is the lowest of the three gradings given to listed buildings and is applied to "buildings of national importance and special interest".  Apart from the village of Burland, the parish is rural.  Most of the listed buildings are houses, cottages or farm buildings.  A group of these date from the 17th century, and most of them are timber-framed.  Another group was built along the Wrexham Road (the A534 road) by the Peckforton estate in Tudor style in about 1870.  The Llangollen Canal passes through the parish, and two listed structures are linked with this, a bridge, and a lock.  The other listed buildings are a former windmill and a signpost.

References
Citations

Sources

Listed buildings in the Borough of Cheshire East
Lists of listed buildings in Cheshire